APCM may refer to:

Adaptive PCM, a signal encoding.
Associated Portland Cement Manufacturers known by its acronym APCM
Blue Circle Industries, named APCM until 1978
Annual Parochial Church Meeting - a yearly meeting required of churches within the Church of England